Esmaeilzadeh (lit. "offspring of Ishmael") is an Iranian surname which can also be found in the Iranian diaspora. Notable people with the surname include:

 Afshin Esmaeilzadeh (born 1992), Iranian football midfielder
 Amirhossein Esmaeilzadeh (born 2000), Iranian footballer
 Farnaz Esmaeilzadeh (born 1988), Iranian speed climber 
 Mojtaba Esmaeilzadeh (born 1990), Iranian footballer
 Mouna Esmaeilzadeh (born 1980), Iranian medical doctor, neuroscientist, entrepreneur and TV personality
 Saeid Esmaeilzadeh (born 1974), Swedish chemist

References 

Persian-language surnames